Ballycullane halt served the village of Ballycullane in County Wexford, Ireland. It was an unstaffed halt and had a single platform which was accessible by a ramp.

The station opened on 1 August 1906, and closed on 18 September 2010. Ballycullane is served on Tuesdays-only by Bus Éireann route 373.

See also 
 List of railway stations in Ireland

References

External links 
 

Iarnród Éireann stations in County Wexford
Disused railway stations in County Wexford
Railway stations opened in 1906
Railway stations closed in 2010
1906 establishments in Ireland
Railway stations in the Republic of Ireland opened in the 20th century